Khadangbam Kothajit Singh (born 17 August 1992) is an India field hockey player who plays as a defender or midfielder for the Indian national team.

He represented India in Men's Hockey during the 2012 London Olympics. He is the third hockey Olympian - after Pangambam Nilakomol Singh and Ksh. Thoiba - from the state of Manipur, known for producing a disproportionate number of international-standard sportspersons. He was a member of the silver-medal winning Indian team at the 2014 Commonwealth Games in Glasgow, Scotland.

He was a member of India's gold-medal winning hockey team at the 2014 Asian Games in Incheon, South Korea. He was India's only goal-scorer in regular time, which ended 1-1 against silver medalist Pakistan. India won 4-2 in a penalty shootout.

References

External links
 Khadangbam Kothajit Singh at Hockey India
 

1992 births
Living people
Field hockey players from Manipur
People from Imphal East district
Male field hockey defenders
Male field hockey midfielders
Asian Games medalists in field hockey
Commonwealth Games silver medallists for India
Asian Games gold medalists for India
2014 Men's Hockey World Cup players
Field hockey players at the 2014 Asian Games
Field hockey players at the 2014 Commonwealth Games
Field hockey players at the 2016 Summer Olympics
Field hockey players at the 2018 Commonwealth Games
2018 Men's Hockey World Cup players
Olympic field hockey players of India
Indian male field hockey players
Commonwealth Games medallists in field hockey
Medalists at the 2014 Asian Games
Medallists at the 2014 Commonwealth Games